Joseph Chieng Jin Ek (born 17 February 1975) is a Malaysian politician who has served as Member of the Sarawak State Legislative Assembly (MLA) for Bukit Assek since December 2021. He is also a member of the Sarawak United Peoples' Party (SUPP), a component party of the ruling Gabungan Parti Sarawak (GPS) coalition in Sarawak.

Election results

References

External links 
 Joseph Chieng Jin Ek on Facebook

1975 births
Living people
Malaysian politicians of Chinese descent
Members of the Sarawak State Legislative Assembly
Sarawak United Peoples' Party politicians
People from Sarawak
University of New South Wales alumni